Frederick, Frederic, Friedrich or Fred Walker may refer to:

Frederick Walker (native police commandant) (died 1866), explorer
Frederick Walker (painter) (1840–1875), English painter and illustrator
Frederic John Walker (1896–1944), British naval officer
Frederic Walker (1829–1889), English cricketer
Fred Walker (entrepreneur) (1884–1935), Australian businessman, original producer of Vegemite
Mysterious Walker (Frederick Mitchell Walker, 1884–1958), American baseball pitcher and college baseball coach
Dixie Walker (Fred E. Walker, 1910–1982), American professional baseball outfielder
Fred Walker (1900s footballer), English footballer for Leeds and Huddersfield
Fred Walker (footballer, born 1913) (1913–?), English footballer for Sheffield Wednesday
Fred L. Walker (1887–1969), U.S. Army general in WW2, commander of the 36th Infantry Division
Frederick James Walker (1876–1914), Irish motorcycle racer
Frederick William Walker (1830–1910), English headmaster
Freddy Walker (born 1994), New Zealand cricketer

See also
Frederick Forestier-Walker (1844–1910), British Army officer